Jeremy Raymond Howe (born 5 September 1973) is an English former professional footballer who played as a midfielder.

Career
Born in Dewsbury, Howe played for Bradford City, making three appearances in the Football League.

References

1973 births
Living people
English footballers
Bradford City A.F.C. players
English Football League players
Association football midfielders